The orange-tufted sunbird (Cinnyris bouvieri) is a species of bird in the family Nectariniidae.
It is found in Angola, Cameroon, Central African Republic, Republic of the Congo, Democratic Republic of the Congo, Equatorial Guinea, Gabon, Kenya, Nigeria, Uganda, and Zambia.

References

orange-tufted sunbird
Birds of Central Africa
orange-tufted sunbird
Taxonomy articles created by Polbot